Season seven of Dancing with the Stars premiered on September 22, 2008, on the ABC network.

Instead of twelve couples as in previous seasons, this was the first season to feature a lineup of thirteen couples. This season also introduced four new dances: the hustle, salsa, jitterbug, and West Coast Swing. 

Model and host Brooke Burke and Derek Hough were crowned the champions, while Tampa Bay Buccaneers defensive tackle Warren Sapp and Kym Johnson finished in second place, and NSYNC singer Lance Bass and Lacey Schwimmer finished third.

Cast

Couples
The official cast announcement was made on the morning of August 25, 2008 on Good Morning America.

Host and judges
Tom Bergeron and Samantha Harris returned as the show's co-hosts. Len Goodman, Bruno Tonioli, and Carrie Ann Inaba returned as the judges, while Michael Flatley appeared as a guest judge during week six.

Scoring charts

Notes

 : This was the lowest score of the week.
 : This was the highest score of the week.
 :  This couple finished in first place.
 :  This couple finished in second place.
 :  This couple finished in third place.
 :  This couple withdrew from the competition.
 :  This couple was in the bottom two, but was not eliminated.
 :  This couple was eliminated.

Highest and lowest scoring performances 
The highest and lowest performances in each dance according to the judges' 30-point scale are as follows.

Couples' highest and lowest scoring dances
Scores are based upon a potential 30-point maximum.

Weekly scores
Individual judges scores in charts below (given in parentheses) are listed in this order from left to right: Carrie Ann Inaba, Len Goodman, Bruno Tonioli.

Week 1
On the first night, each couple performed either the cha-cha-cha or foxtrot. On the second night, each couple performed either the quickstep or mambo. Two couples were eliminated by the end of the second night. Couples are listed in the order they performed.
Night 1

Night 2

Week 2
Each couple performed either the rumba or paso doble. Couples are listed in the order they performed.

Week 3
Each couple performed either the jive or Viennese waltz. Couples are listed in the order they performed.

On October 3, Misty May-Treanor was injured during practice and received immediate medical attention. At the end of the episode that aired on Monday, October 6, she announced that she had ruptured her Achilles tendon, and thus had to withdraw from the competition. On the results show the next night, Tom Bergeron revealed that no one would be eliminated that week because of May-Treanor's withdrawal, and the week 3 scores would be combined with the scores from week 4.

Week 4
Each couple performed either the samba or tango. Couples are listed in the order they performed.

Week 5
Each couple performed one of four dances newly introduced this season: the hustle, jitterbug, salsa, or West Coast Swing. Couples are listed in the order they performed.

On Sunday, October 19, Brooke Burke was injured during the camera blocking for her jitterbug with partner Derek Hough. She ended up going to the hospital on Monday, October 20, for treatment and x-rays. It was determined that she had severely bruised her foot, but as of Monday afternoon, an ABC spokesperson told People that Burke and Hough would still perform on that night's live show.

Week 6
Individual judges scores in charts below (given in parentheses) are listed in this order from left to right: Carrie Ann Inaba, Michael Flatley, Bruno Tonioli.

Each couple performed one unlearned dance, and participated in a group hip-hop dance. Couples are listed in the order they performed.

Week 7
Each couple performed one unlearned dance and one team dance. Couples are listed in the order they performed.

Forty minutes after the October 21 results show, Julianne Hough was taken by ambulance to the hospital for increasingly painful stomach pains. Initially, Hough said she was taking a day off from the group rehearsal to relax and try and feel better. However, on October 27, she was diagnosed with endometriosis. She had to undergo surgery to remove her appendix on October 28, and that she would bow out of the competition until she recovered. Her partner, Cody Linley, was paired with Edyta Śliwińska for weeks 7 and 8 of the competition. 

On October 30, Lacey Schwimmer reported that she had endometriosis as well. Julianne Hough's experience with the common, but painful, condition allowed Schwimmer to notice similar symptoms and be diagnosed at an early stage, enabling it to be treated without surgery or time away from the show.

Week 8
Each couple performed two unlearned dances. Couples are listed in the order they performed.

Week 9
Each couple performed two unlearned dances. Couples are listed in the order they performed.

Julianne Hough returned to the competition after missing the previous two weeks.

Week 10
On the first night, all three couples faced off in a group samba, where they received individual scores from the judges, and performed their freestyle routine. On the second night, each couple performed their favorite routine from the season. Couples are listed in the order they performed.
Night 1

Night 2

Dance chart
The celebrities and professional partners danced one of these routines for each corresponding week:
 Week 1 (Night 1): One unlearned dance (cha-cha-cha or foxtrot)
 Week 1 (Night 2): One unlearned dance (mambo or quickstep)
 Week 2: One unlearned dance (paso doble or rumba)
 Week 3: One unlearned dance (jive or Viennese waltz)
 Week 4: One unlearned dance (samba or tango)
 Week 5: One unlearned dance (hustle, jitterbug, salsa, or West Coast Swing)
 Week 6: One unlearned dance & group hip-hop dance
 Week 7: One unlearned dance & team dances
 Week 8: Two unlearned dances
 Week 9: Two unlearned dances
 Week 10 (Night 1): Samba face-off & freestyle
 Week 10 (Night 2): Favorite dance of the season

Notes

 :  This was the highest scoring dance of the week.
 :  This was the lowest scoring dance of the week.
 :  This couple danced, but received no scores.

References

External links

Dancing with the Stars (American TV series)
2008 American television seasons